Gabriele Ferrarini (born 9 April 2000) is an Italian professional footballer who plays as a right-back for  club Modena, on loan from Fiorentina.

Club career

Fiorentina
He is a product of Fiorentina youth teams and started playing for their Under-19 squad in the 2017–18 season.

For the last three games of the 2018–19 Serie A season he was called up to the senior squad, but remained on the bench.

Loan to Pistoiese
On 29 August 2019 he joined Serie C club Pistoiese on a season-long loan.

He made his professional Serie C debut for Pistoiese on 1 September 2019 in a game against Pergolettese. He started the game and played the whole match. He scored his first professional goal on 21 September 2019 in a 1–1 draw with Como.

Loan to Venezia 
On 25 August 2020, he became a new Venezia player.

Loan to Perugia 
On 20 August 2021, he joined Perugia on loan.

Loans to Monza and Modena 
On 1 September 2022, Ferrarini moved on loan to newly-promoted Serie A side Monza. He only made two bench appearances for Monza and never saw any time on the field. On 31 January 2023, he moved on a new loan to Modena in Serie B.

International career
He was first called up to represent his country for Under-18 squad friendlies in 2017.

He was included in the 2019 UEFA European Under-19 Championship squad and played in all 3 games, last 2 as a starter, as Italy was eliminated at group stage.

On 3 September 2021 he made his debut with the Italy U21 squad, playing as a substitute in the qualifying match won 3–0 against Luxembourg.

Career statistics

Club

References

External links
 

2000 births
Living people
People from La Spezia
Sportspeople from the Province of La Spezia
Footballers from Liguria
Italian footballers
Italy youth international footballers
Italy under-21 international footballers
Association football fullbacks
ACF Fiorentina players
U.S. Pistoiese 1921 players
Venezia F.C. players
A.C. Perugia Calcio players
A.C. Monza players
Modena F.C. 2018 players
Serie C players
Serie B players